Eugeniusz Abrahamowicz (1851  - 1905) was a Polish conservative politician, lawyer, and landowner. In the years 1891–1905 he was a Member of the Austrian parliament, and was a spokesman for the interests of landowners in Lviv.

References

1851 births
1905 deaths
People from Chernivtsi Oblast
People from the Duchy of Bukovina
19th-century Polish politicians
Members of the Austrian House of Deputies (1891–1897)
Members of the Austrian House of Deputies (1897–1900)
Members of the Austrian House of Deputies (1901–1907)
19th-century Polish landowners
20th-century Polish landowners